The 2016 UTSA Roadrunners football team represented the University of Texas at San Antonio in the 2016 NCAA Division I FBS football season. The Roadrunners played their home games at the Alamodome in San Antonio, Texas and competed in the West Division of Conference USA (C–USA). They were led by first-year head coach Frank Wilson. They finished the season 6–7, 5–3 in C-USA play to finish in second place in the West Division. They were invited to the New Mexico Bowl, the school's first ever bowl game, where they were defeated by New Mexico.

Schedule
UTSA announced its 2016 football schedule on February 4, 2016. The 2016 schedule consists of 6 home and away games in the regular season. The Roadrunners will host C–USA foes Charlotte, North Texas, Southern Miss, and UTEP, and will travel to Louisiana Tech, Middle Tennessee, Old Dominion, and Rice.

The team will play four non–conference games, two home games against Alabama State from the Southwestern Athletic Conference (SWAC) and Arizona State from the Pac-12 Conference, and two road games which are against the Colorado State Rams from the Mountain West Conference and the Texas A&M Aggies from the Southeastern Conference (SEC).

Game summaries

Alabama State

at Colorado State

Arizona State

at Old Dominion

Southern Miss

at Rice

UTEP

North Texas

at Middle Tennessee

at Louisiana Tech

at Texas A&M

Charlotte

at New Mexico–New Mexico Bowl

Personnel

Coaching staff

References

UTSA
UTSA Roadrunners football seasons
UTSA Roadrunners football